The 2023 Nigerian Senate elections in Plateau State will be held on 25 February 2023, to elect the 3 federal Senators from Plateau State, one from each of the state's three senatorial districts. The elections will coincide with the 2023 presidential election, as well as other elections to the Senate and elections to the House of Representatives; with state elections being held two weeks later. Primaries were held between 4 April and 9 June 2022.

Background
In the previous Senate elections, none of the three incumbent senators were returned as all three retired from the Senate. In the Central district, Hezekiah Ayuba Dimka held the seat for the APC with 48% of the vote while Ignatius Datong Longjan gained the South district for the APC with 51%. In the North district, Istifanus Gyang held the seat for the PDP with 58% of the vote. The senatorial results were an example of slight APC gains in the state as the party also gained a House of Representatives seat; it also won a majority in the House of Assembly and incumbent Governor Simon Lalong won re-election in the gubernatorial election. However, Abubakar narrowly won the state in the presidential election.

Overview

Summary

Plateau Central 

The Plateau Central Senatorial District covers the local government areas of Bokkos, Mangu, Pankshin, Kanke, and Kanam. Incumbent Hezekiah Ayuba Dimka (APC), who was elected with 48.4% of the vote in 2019, is seeking re-election. In March 2022, Dimka announced that he would run for governor of Plateau State instead of seeking re-election; he eventually withdrew from the APC gubernatorial primary.

General election

Results

Plateau North 

The Plateau North Senatorial District covers the local government areas of Barkin Ladi, Bassa, Jos East, Jos North, Jos South, and Riyom. Incumbent Istifanus Gyang (PDP), who was elected with 58.1% of the vote in 2019, sought re-election but lost renomination.

General election

Results

Plateau South 

The Plateau South Senatorial District covers the local government areas of Langtang North, Langtang South, Mikang, Qua'an Pan, Shendam, and Wase. In 2019, Ignatius Datong Longjan (APC) was elected to the seat with 51.2% of the vote but he died in February 2020. In the ensuing December 2020 by-election, Nora Daduut (APC) was elected with 53.4% of the vote; she initially opted to seek re-election before withdrawing from the APC primary.

Campaign
Reporting on the campaign noted that Lalong spent a significant part of the campaign season traveling nationwide with for Tinubu presidential campaign; thus he had not spent much of the campaign period in the district.

General election

Results

See also 
 2023 Nigerian Senate election
 2023 Nigerian elections
 2023 Plateau State elections

References 

Plateau State senatorial elections
2023 Plateau State elections
Plateau State Senate elections